Peter John Purves (born 10 February 1939) is an English television presenter and actor. He played Steven Taylor in Doctor Who under the First Doctor, a role he continued to play in audio dramas for Big Finish Productions. He later became a presenter on the BBC children's programme Blue Peter for eleven years. He has continued to make regular television appearances, including coverage of the Crufts dog show.

Early life
Purves was born in New Longton, near Preston, Lancashire. His father was a tailor who also ran a hotel in Blackpool for a short period. He was educated at the independent Arnold School in Blackpool and in the sixth form at Barrow-in-Furness Grammar School for Boys for a year, where he took A-levels and gained a pass in mathematics. He originally planned to go into teaching, training at Alsager College of Education, but began to act with the Barrow-in-Furness Repertory Company instead.

Doctor Who
Purves first appeared in Doctor Who in the role of Morton Dill in The Chase after being cast by director Richard Martin.

At 26 years old, Purves first became known to television audiences in 1965 as Steven Taylor, one of the early time-travelling companions in the programme Doctor Who, when the Doctor was played by William Hartnell. He has provided DVD commentaries for many of the surviving Doctor Who episodes he appeared in and documents the making of each of his Doctor Who stories in his autobiography, Here's One I Wrote Earlier. He was also a good friend of the actor Jon Pertwee, who played the Third Doctor.

Purves has said that he prefers the historical stories on the show, such as The Massacre of St Bartholomew's Eve and The Myth Makers.

In 2007, he returned to the role of Steven Taylor in the audio drama Mother Russia and has portrayed him in several additional audio dramas in the years since.

Blue Peter
After leaving Doctor Who, Purves became a regular presenter on the children's magazine programme Blue Peter from 1967 to 1978. He co-presented Blue Peter first with John Noakes and Valerie Singleton and then with Noakes and Lesley Judd, during the programme's perceived golden age. After Noakes, Purves is the longest-serving male Blue Peter presenter.

Purves maintained his connection to Doctor Who throughout his time on Blue Peter, often hosting special features on the programme and interviewing the actors. These included clips from episodes which are otherwise now lost, including The Daleks' Master Plan, in which Purves himself had appeared.

Dogs have featured in Purves's career since his Blue Peter days when he was given charge of one of the "Blue Peter Pets", Petra, a German Shepherd cross. Purves also presented the spin-off Blue Peter Special Assignment.

Later television appearances

After leaving Blue Peter, Purves presented Stopwatch and We're Going Places, then had spells as the front man for darts events on the BBC and as presenter of the long-running BBC1 motorcycle trials series Kick Start.

His later TV career has included cameo appearances in episodes of the soap opera EastEnders and sitcom The Office. In The Office episode "Training Day" Purves played himself in a customer care training video that David Brent and his staff were being shown (Purves is in fact a qualified business trainer and a motivational speaker).

Purves has had a 40-year association with television coverage of major dog shows such as Crufts and his 2007 appearance as a judge on the reality TV programme The Underdog Show. He also writes for the dog press and regularly presents at dog award shows. Marking his 70th birthday, his 2009 autobiography Here's One I Wrote Earlier was released at The Kennel Club.

Theatre
Purves has worked as a pantomime director and has directed over 30 pantomime productions. In December 2012, he portrayed Alderman Fitzwarren in Dick Whittington at Harpenden Public Halls: this was the first time he performed in pantomime since 1985. He is also an after-dinner speaker.

Personal life
Purves lived for a time in the Bilton area of Rugby, Warwickshire, and then Northamptonshire. He now lives in the Suffolk village of Sibton with his wife, the West End actress Kathryn Evans. He was previously married from 1962 to 1982 to a Leeds-born playwright, Gilly Fraser (actual name Gillian Emmett). In 2008, Valerie Singleton revealed she had enjoyed a "brief fling" with Purves when he was "between marriages".

Purves is an atheist.

In December 2022 Purves received an honorary fellowship from the University of Central Lancashire. A university spokesman said his "inspirational career" had shown "a significant contribution in services to television, in acting and presenting".

Credits

TV career
Doctor Who (46 episodes, 1965–1966)
Blue Peter (1967–1978)
Blue Peter Special Assignment (1977–1981)
Stopwatch (40 episodes, 1978–1981)
We're Going Places (23 episodes, 1978–1980)
Kick Start (1981–1992)

Audio dramas

References

External links

Official Site
Peter Purves BBC Blue Peter

1939 births
Living people
Alumni of Manchester Metropolitan University
BBC sports presenters and reporters
Blue Peter presenters
English atheists
English game show hosts
English male stage actors
English male television actors
Male actors from Lancashire
People educated at Arnold School
People educated at Barrow-in-Furness Grammar School for Boys
Actors from Preston, Lancashire
Television personalities from Lancashire
Mass media people from Preston, Lancashire